"You're My One and Only Love" is a song written by Barney Kessel and Jack Marshall, and originally performed by Ricky Nelson. The song reached number 14 on the Billboard Hot 100 in 1957.

The single's B-side was "Honey Rock", written by Barney Kessel.

Other versions
Edna McGriff released a version in Australia as the B-side to her 1957 single, "And That Reminds Me".

References

1957 songs
1957 singles
Ricky Nelson songs
Verve Records singles